Benjamin Morrison is an American football cornerback for the Notre Dame Fighting Irish.

High school career
Morrison attended Brophy College Preparatory in Phoenix, Arizona. As a senior, he had 53 tackles and two interceptions. He played in the 2022 Polynesian Bowl. Morrison committed to the University of Notre Dame to play college football.

College career
Morrison earned immediate playing time his true freshman year at Notre Dame in 2022. He had his first two career interceptions in an upset victory over Clemson. Two weeks later, he had three interceptions against Boston College.

Statistics

Personal life
His father, Darryl Morrison, played in the NFL.

References

External links
Notre Dame Fighting Irish bio

Living people
Players of American football from Arizona
American football cornerbacks
Notre Dame Fighting Irish football players
2004 births